Lee Hae-man (이해만, born 20 February 1972) is a South Korean sledge hockey player. He was a member of South Korea's bronze medal winning team in para ice hockey at the 2018 Winter Paralympics. Lee also competed in the 2010 Winter Paralympics.

References

External links 
 

1972 births
Living people
South Korean sledge hockey players
Paralympic sledge hockey players of South Korea
Paralympic bronze medalists for South Korea
Para ice hockey players at the 2018 Winter Paralympics
Medalists at the 2018 Winter Paralympics
Paralympic medalists in sledge hockey